The Táchira antpitta (Grallaria chthonia) is a cryptic bird species. It is placed in the family Grallariidae. Until 2016 this species had not been sighted since 1956, and was thought possibly extinct. However, in June 2016, scientists rediscovered the Táchira antpitta in Venezuela's El Tamá National Park.

Description
The Táchira antpitta reaches a length of 17 cm. Its upperparts are brownish. Crown and nape are coloured grey. The mantle has black barrings. Throat and ear coverts are brown. It is further characterised by a white malar stripe. The lower belly is whitish, the flanks and the breast have grey barrings.

Status
Prior to June 2016, the Táchira antpitta was last seen in 1956. Between 1955 and 1956 the ornithologists William H. Phelps Jr. and Alexander Wetmore collected four specimens in the type locality at the hacienda La Providencia at the Rio Chiquita in the south-western part of Táchira, Venezuela. The type locality is located in the El Tamá National Park where some suitable habitat still remains. However, between 1990 and 1996 the cloud forest in the Rio Chiquita valley - including parts of the national park and the type locality - was entirely changed into coffee plantations below 1,600 m ASL, and largely cut down for vegetable gardens between 1,900 and 2,200 m ASL.

Despite extensive searches from 1990 to 1996, the species was not relocated. It was formerly classified as endangered by the IUCN, but with then-current research failing to rediscover the species, it was uplisted to critically endangered status in 2008.

In June 2016, a team of researchers from the Red Siskin Initiative, a conservation partnership between the Smithsonian Institution and several Venezuelan scientific organizations, relocated the Táchira antpitta, obtaining the first ever sound recordings ever made of the species, and the first photographs ever taken of a living bird.

Footnotes

References
 BirdLife International (BLI) (2008): [2008 IUCN Redlist status changes]. Retrieved 2008-MAY-23.

External links
BirdLife Species Factsheet.

Táchira antpitta
Birds of the Venezuelan Andes
Endemic birds of Venezuela
Critically endangered animals
Critically endangered biota of South America
Táchira antpitta
Taxa named by Alexander Wetmore